The 1952 United States presidential election in Mississippi took place on November 4, 1952, as part of the United States presidential election of 1952.

The Democratic Party candidate, Governor Adlai Stevenson of Illinois, won the state of Mississippi over Dwight D. Eisenhower, the former Supreme Allied Commander Europe and General of the Army by a margin of 59,600 votes, or 20.88%. Eisenhower went on to win the election nationally, with 442 electoral votes and a commanding 10.9% lead over Stevenson in the popular vote.

Incumbent president Harry S. Truman was the last president who was unaffected by the term limit imposed under the 22nd Amendment, but decided as early as 1950 that he would not seek another term. Illinois governor Adlai Stevenson II, grandson of former Vice President Adlai Stevenson I, accepted the Democratic nomination for president in Truman’s place, selecting Alabama Senator John Sparkman, a Southern Democrat, as his running mate.

Analysis 
Mississippi in this time period was a one-party state dominated by the Democratic Party. The Republican Party was virtually nonexistent as a result of disenfranchisement among poor whites and African Americans, including voter intimidation against those who refused to vote Democratic. The 1948 election split the National Democratic Party and segregationist Democrats over the issue of civil rights for African Americans. In the 1952 election, Stevenson, a moderate on race issues, selected the segregationist Senator Sparkman as his running mate to avoid another split in the Democratic vote.

Vote 
The Stevenson-Sparkman ticket carried Mississippi and its eight electoral votes in a landslide against the Eisenhower-Nixon ticket with 60.44% of the popular vote, amounting to a total of 172,566 votes. These results, however, were the weakest for a state Democrat since the 1872 election when the state remained occupied by Union troops and Republican Ulysses S. Grant carried the state. It represented a large swing for the Republicans from 1948, when Thomas E. Dewey won only 2.62% of the vote.

Stevenson carried 67 of Mississippi’s 82 counties, running up huge margins in the northeastern corner and rural areas of the state. Eisenhower, whose Mississippi electors were “Independent”, carried fifteen counties, the first time a national Republican had carried any since Herbert Hoover in 1928 carried Pearl River County, George County and Stone County, and only the second since Benjamin Harrison in 1888. His main base of support came from the western counties along the Mississippi River, which had a high concentration of nonvoting African Americans, including Hinds County, home to the state capital Jackson. Three counties – Sharkey, Forrest, and Lowndes – gave Eisenhower over sixty percent of the vote.

In contrast, the northeastern hills, which had given President Truman his highest proportion in 1948, along with the southeastern pineywoods both voted solidly for Stevenson, although not by the margins pre-1948 Democrats ran up throughout Mississippi. Whereas Delta whites had permanently estranged themselves from the Democratic Party over issues of economics and race, Hills and Pine Belt counties, much more economically populist although even more socially conservative, had not shared much in the Dixiecrat upheaval despite all giving majorities to “Democrat” Strom Thurmond in 1948. The divide between traditional Democrat Stevenson and the independent electors pledged to Eisenhower was closely related to the cleavage between “Delta” and “Hills” seen in Democratic white primaries during the first half of the twentieth century.

1952 began to show signs of the impending collapse of Democratic dominance in Mississippi and the rest of the South. The percentage of victory for the Democratic candidate would decline in the next two subsequent elections, ultimately paving the way for Barry Goldwater’s victory in Mississippi and the Deep South in 1964.

Results

Results by county

References 

Mississippi
1952 Mississippi elections
1952